Pearl and Savages is a 1921 documentary from filmmaker Frank Hurley about the people of Papua New Guinea and Torres Strait.

Production
Hurley left for Papua in December 1920 to record the work of Anglican missionaries in the region. He made the documentary which was a popular success on release in 1921, with Hurley often accompanying screenings to give a lecture. He also wrote a book to accompany the film.

Reviews were strong, one critic calling it "probably the most beautifully photographed pictorial of the kind that has ever been screened."

Second Visit and With the Headhunters in Papua
Hurley then visited Papua again at his own expense in 1923 to shoot additional footage. He was accompanied by Allan McCullock from the Australian Museum in Sydney. During the trip they obtained hundreds of cultural objects, angering the administrator of Papua the time, Sir Herbert Murray. Murray arranged for some objects to be returned to their owners but the rest were deposited in the Australian Museum. In 1925 Murray would refuse to allow Hurley to enter Papua to make another film.

Hurley incorporated the new footage into the documentary. The new film was called With the Headhunters in Papua and released in October 1923.

The Lost Tribe
Hurley took the movie to America where it was screened under the title of The Lost Tribe but it did not meet with popular success and he wound up losing thousands of pounds. Hurley once claimed at a screening in Philadelphia was attended by only five people. It also did not perform particularly well in England, although the film managed a sale of £1,500 to Germany.

This prompted Hurley to move into dramatic feature film making with  Jungle Woman (1926) and The Hound of the Deep (1926).

The company Hurley used to make the film was voluntarily wound up in 1927.

Reconstruction
In 1979 the film was reconstructed by Keith Pardy from the National Film Archive of the National Library of Australia using material such as a 1925 program brochure, Hurley's diaries, and his book Pearls and Savages: Adventures in the Air, On Land and Sea in New Guinea (1924).

References

External links
Pearls and Savages at Australian Screen Online

Pearls and Savages at National Film and Sound Archive

Australian documentary films
Films set in Papua New Guinea
Headhunting accounts and studies
1921 films
1921 documentary films
Black-and-white documentary films
Australian silent feature films
Australian black-and-white films
Silent films in color